The Devil's Hall of Fame is the first studio album by Danish progressive metal band Beyond Twilight. Released July 23, 2001. The album has many of the band's characteristic elements such as complex arrangements and dramatic dark multi-layers and was written mostly by the band's mastermind, Finn Zierler. The album showcases the elements which would become characteristic of Beyond Twilight's unique sound, namely a very atmospheric, heavy progressive sound. On release, the album was met with good reviews from fans and critics. It's their only album featuring Norwegian singer Jørn Lande.

Track listing

Personnel

Beyond Twilight
Finn Zierler – keyboard
Jørn Lande – lead vocals
Anders Ericson Kragh – guitar
Anders Devillian Lindgren – bass
Tomas Fredén – drums, percussion

Production
Produced by Tommy Hansen & Beyond Twilight
Co-produced by Hitworks & Beyond Twilight
Mixed Tommy Hansen & Finn Zierler
Recorded at Jailhouse Studios, Hitworks Studio, Zierler Studio
Mixed at Jailhouse Studios 
All music composed and arranged by Finn Zierler
All vocal melodies by Jørn Lande
All choir arrangements by Finn Zierler & Jørn Lande

References

2001 debut albums
Beyond Twilight albums
Massacre Records albums